This list of types of systems engineering gives an overview of the types of systems engineering. The reference section gives an overview of major publications in each field and the universities that offer these programs. Universities can be listed here under multiple specialism. A general list of universities that offer SE programs is given in the List of systems engineering at universities.

B 
 Biological systems engineering

C 
 Communications system engineering, see telecommunication
 Computer systems engineering, see also computer engineering

 Computer science and systems engineering, see also computer science

 Control systems engineering

E
 Earth systems engineering and management
 Electronic systems engineering, see also electronic engineering

 Enterprise systems engineering
 Environmental systems engineering, see also environmental engineering

I
 Information systems engineering, see also information science
 Integrating functionality

M
 Manufacturing systems engineering, see also industrial engineering

 Marine systems engineering, see also naval architecture

 Mechanical and systems engineering, see also mechanical engineering

P
Petroleum systems engineering, see also petroleum engineering

 Power systems engineering, see also power engineering

 Process systems engineering, see also industrial engineering

S
 Software systems engineering, see also software engineering
 Space systems engineering, see also aerospace engineering

 Structural systems engineering, see also structural engineering

 Systems and information engineering, see also information science

 Systems engineering management, see also systems engineering

See also 
 List of systems engineering at universities
 List of systems engineering books (WPS list)
 List of systems engineers
 List of types of systems theory

References